X-Men 2: Clone Wars is a 1995 platform game developed by Headgames and released by Sega of America for the Mega Drive/Genesis as a sequel to the 1993's X-Men. The game is based on the adventures of the Marvel Comics superhero team, the X-Men. A sequel, titled X-Women, was cancelled.

Gameplay

The game begins with a cold open; the first level begins as soon as the game is turned on with a random character (depending on the direction the player pressed on the controller's d-pad) after completing the first stage, the title screen and credits roll, and the player is given the option to switch characters.

Each character has a "mutant attack power" that can be used in combat. Unlike the preceding game, there is no energy bar that limits the amount of mutant attack powers a player can use. Some of the mutant attack powers can be charged to a greater effect by holding down the power button. The attack powers increase in power when the character has nine or ten bars of health and can perform different functions if the character is in the air.

In addition to these attack powers, each character has several lesser abilities, maneuvers and quirks which make gameplay a different experience with each (see above) these attack powers can be used to reach hidden health pickups (which take the form of a double helix) or as a shortcut. Players begin the game with eight lives (meaning nine attempts) that are shared by all characters, with no way to gain more.

Plot
The game is based on the current story arc from the comics at the time of development. The plot is narrated through the Cerebro and Professor X's communication with each other. Cerebro detects that the technorganic alien race known as the Phalanx have returned and have contaminated a sentinel manufacturing facility. Learning this, Professor X sends the X-Men (Beast, Psylocke, Gambit, Nightcrawler, Wolverine, and Cyclops) to destroy the Phalanx virus, but discovers that the virus has spread to Avalon, home of Exodus and Magneto. Magneto then allies with the X-Men in preventing the Phalanx from taking control of Earth by assimilating all of its inhabitants. They trace the Phalanx to Apocalypse's facility, where he has allowed the virus to spread. After defeating him, they leave to the Savage Land where they defeat a Phalanx clone of Brainchild who was overseeing the assimilation. They continue to the Phalanx ship where they are attacked by Deathbird, and then proceed to the clone factory and the Nexus before confronting Phalanx clones of themselves.

Characters
Beast - Beast possesses acrobatic abilities; including clinging to walls, a powerful diving attack and can also perform a strong normal attack.
Cyclops - Cyclops' optic blast can be charged to become stronger and can damage several of his enemies; in addition; he can use a small array of martial arts attacks, such as combo punches and a flying kick in melee. 
Gambit - Gambit's mutant power is a fast ranged attack that can be charged to both do more damage and fire several cards. Gambit's melee attacks are similar to Cyclops', but with greater range.
Nightcrawler - Nightcrawler's mutant power is an explosive teleportation that can be charged for greater range and damage; allows him to move quickly from one spot to another. His strength is in acrobatic movements, including wall-crawling, double-jumping and diving attacks.
Psylocke - Psylocke can utilize a psychic knife attack and is also equipped with a sword for use against all her enemies. She can cling to walls, double jump and perform both a flying lunge with her psychic knife, and a 360-jumping attack with her sword.
Wolverine - Wolverine's mutant power is a lunge with his claws, with an additional power in his regeneration powers, allowing him to restore a small amount of health. He can also scale walls by using his claws as pitons and perform a double jump.
Magneto (unlockable after the third level) - Magneto is unique in having no melee attacks – his basic attack consists of a limitless barrage of energy blasts and his mutant power is an explosive electromagnetic orb that can traverse walls. He can also hover in mid-air and perform attacks from this position.

Release
X-Men 2 was one of a handful releases for the Sega Genesis in 1995 that used a paper box rather than the standard clamshell case Genesis games came in. The European release of the game reused the same cover art as X-Men 2: Game Master's Legacy for the Game Gear, a different and unrelated game. The game was given a KA (Kids to Adults) rating by the Entertainment Software Rating Board.

The game's music was composed by Kurt Harland, of electronica band Information Society. A soundtrack album was released in 1996. Some levels featured different soundtrack elements depending on the character selected although the basic structure of the level's musical theme remained the same.

Reception

X-Men 2: Clone Wars was met with mostly mixed reviews. GamePro remarked that the sound effects and music are a mixed bag, and criticized the two-player mode's tight scrolling, but praised the large sprites and the special abilities of the player characters. Electronic Gaming Monthly also complimented the characters' special abilities but criticized that the game is little different from the original X-Men and suffers from a number of weak points, and concluded that "the game never seems to come alive, despite a few cool (not to mention huge) bosses and challenging levels". GameFans Takahara found the graphics, cinematic intro, and the need to match each character's unique abilities to each stage to all be impressive, though he rated the music as "average". A reviewer for Next Generation remarked that the game has more playable characters, more complex moves, more levels, and more gameplay twists than the original X-Men, but is still no more than a rental title.

According to a retrospective review in GameFan, "in short, Clone Wars is everything Uncanny X-Men was not: nice to look at with its well-animated 16-bit characters and multi-layer backgrounds, easy to pick up and play thanks to good controls and an easily understood interface; a story that is fine for one player but more fun with two", adding, X-Men "ranks among the best comic book games produced in the era". Complex ranked X-Men 2 as the 18th best game on the Sega Genesis, adding that "the game achieved the rarely seen balanced gaming". It was also ranked as the 20th top Genesis game by ScrewAttack, who noted it for having in their opinion the best soundtrack on the system. X-Men 2 placed 19th on the 2013 list of best Marvel video games by Geek Magazine, who stated that "the soundtrack was just as good as Mutant Apocalypse, and each stage was ripe with cool nods to the comics".

X-Women

A sequel featuring only the female members of the X-Men had been in development by Sega for the same platform, and was due out in early 1997, but was cancelled.

References

External links
X-Men 2: Clone Wars X-Men 2: Clone Wars at MobyGames

1995 video games
Video games about cloning
Cooperative video games
Multiplayer and single-player video games
Sega beat 'em ups
Sega Genesis games
Sega Genesis-only games
Side-scrolling platform games
Side-scrolling beat 'em ups
Video games based on X-Men
Video games developed in the United States
Video games featuring female protagonists
Superhero video games
Video games scored by Kurt Harland
Video games set in Antarctica
Video games set in Russia
Video games set in South America